The 1967 UC Santa Barbara Gauchos football team represented University of California, Santa Barbara (UCSB) during the 1967 NCAA College Division football season.

UCSB competed as an Independent in 1967. The team was led by fifth-year head coach "Cactus Jack" Curtice, and played home games at Campus Stadium in Santa Barbara, California. They finished the season with a record of five wins and five losses (5–5). For the 1967 season they outscored their opponents 230–205.

Schedule

Team players in the NFL
The following Santa Barbara Gaucho players were selected in the 1968 NFL Draft.

References

UC Santa Barbara
UC Santa Barbara Gauchos football seasons
UC Santa Barbara Gauchos football